Nikoloz Chkheidze commonly known as Karlo Chkheidze ( – 13 June 1926), was a Georgian politician. In the 1890s, he promoted the Social Democratic movement in Georgia. He became a key figure in the Russian Revolution (February 1917 to October 1917) as the Menshevik president of the Executive Committee of the Soviet of Petrograd (until September 1917). Later he served as president of the Transcaucasian Sejm (February 1918 to May 1918), and he held office in the Transcaucasian Democratic Federative Republic (April–May 1918). Later he became president of parliamentary assemblies of the Democratic Republic of Georgia, National Council, Constituent Assembly and Parliament (May 1918 to March 1921).

Early life and family
Chkheidze was born to an aristocratic family in Puti, Kutais Governorate (in the present-day Zestafoni Municipality of the Imereti province of Georgia). From his marriage with Alexandra Taganova (X-1943), he will have four children including a daughter who will accompany him in exile.

Political career
In 1892, Chkheidze, together with Egnate Ninoshvili, Silibistro Jibladze, Noe Zhordania and Kalenike Chkheidze (his brother), became a founder of the first Georgian Social-Democratic group, Mesame Dasi (the third team).

Russia 

From 1907 to 1917, Chkheidze was a member of Tiflis Gubernyia in the Russian State Duma and gained popularity as a spokesman for the Menshevik faction within the Russian Social Democratic Party. He was an active member of the irregular freemasonic lodge, the Grand Orient of Russia’s Peoples.
In 1917, the year of the Russian Revolution, Chkheidze became Chairman of the Petrograd Soviet. He failed to prevent the rise of radical Bolshevism and refused a post in the Russian Provisional Government. However, he did support its policies and advocated revolutionary oboronchestvo (defencism). He also voted to continue the war against the German Empire.

Transcaucasia 
In October 1917, the Bolsheviks seized power in Russia. At the time, Chkheidze was in Georgia. He remained in Georgia and on 23 February 1918, became leader of the Transcaucasian Federation in Tiflis. Some months later the federation was dissolved.

Democratic Republic of Georgia 
On 26 May 1918, the Act of Independence of Georgia was adopted, Chkheidze was elected chairman of the National Council of Georgia: this Georgian Provisional Assembly decided to appoint a government, to prepare elections and to create a constitutional commission. In February 1919 he was elected a member of the Constituent Assembly of Georgia and on March 12 president of this assembly, but could not participate in its first session because he was located in Paris. Chairing the Georgian delegation to the Versailles Conference, he tried to gain the Entente's support for the Democratic Republic of Georgia. He also proposed to Georges Clemenceau and to David Lloyd George a French or British protectorate for Georgian foreign affairs and defense, but was unsuccessful. Chkheidze, who had 14 years of parliamentary life experience, oversaw the writing of the Constitution by Razhden Arsenidze and 14 other MPs of the majority and the opposition.

France 
In March 1921, when the Red Army invaded Georgia, Chkheidze fled with his family to France via Constantinople. In 1923 and 1924, as part of the Social Democratic Labour Party of Georgia in exile, Chkheidze opposed a national uprising in Georgia. Chkheidze, Irakly Tsereteli, Datiko Sharashidze, and Kale Kavtaradze formed a group called Oppozitsia. In their mind, the Red Army and Cheka were too strong, and the unarmed Georgian people too weak. After the August Uprising of 1924, 10,000 Georgians were executed, and between 50,000 and 100,000 Georgians were deported to Siberia or to Central Asia.

Death

On 13 June 1926, Chkheidze committed suicide, in his official residence in Leuville-sur-Orge, France. He was buried in Paris, in the Père Lachaise Cemetery.

References

Bibliography

External links
 Чхеидзе, Николай Семенович Hronos.km.ru.

1864 births
1926 deaths
People from Imereti
People from Kutais Governorate
Russian Social Democratic Labour Party members
Mensheviks
Social Democratic Party of Georgia politicians
Members of the 3rd State Duma of the Russian Empire
Members of the 4th State Duma of the Russian Empire
Russian Constituent Assembly members
Heads of state of former countries
Democratic Republic of Georgia
Diplomats of Georgia (country)
Revolutionaries from Georgia (country)
People of the Russian Revolution
Members of the Grand Orient of Russia's Peoples
Georgian independence activists
Georgian exiles
Georgian emigrants to France
Politicians from Georgia (country) who committed suicide
Heads of state who committed suicide
Suicides in France
1926 suicides